Here We Go... is the debut studio album by American R&B singer-songwriter Chantay Savage, released on June 22, 1993 on RCA Records. Here We Go... peaked at number 89 on Billboards Top R&B/Hip-Hop Albums chart.

Track listing

Charts

References

External links
 Savage Take Over 'Here We Go...' — By Billboard

1994 albums
RCA Records albums
Chantay Savage albums